Florida Avenue is a major street in Washington, D.C.  It was originally named Boundary Street, because it formed the northern boundary of the Federal City under the 1791 L'Enfant Plan. With the growth of the city beyond its original borders, Boundary Street was renamed Florida Avenue in 1890.

History
On July 9, 1790, Congress passed the Residence Act, which approved the creation of a national capital on the Potomac River. The exact location was to be selected by President George Washington, who chose a portion of the states of Maryland and Virginia on January 24, 1791. Originally, government officials did not foresee that the city of Washington would expand to fill the boundaries of the entire District of Columbia. The "Federal City", or City of Washington, originally lay within an area bounded by Boundary Street (northwest and northeast), 15th Street Northeast, East Capitol Street, the Anacostia River, the Potomac River, and Rock Creek.

The first section of Boundary Street to be opened was between North Capitol Street and 2nd Street NE in 1818. By 1828, the street extended westward at least to 19th Street NW.

Boundary Street was renamed Florida Avenue on January 14, 1890, by a decision of the Board of Commissioners. The Washington Post reported the next day that the Commissioners had received numerous complaints by property owners that the name of Boundary Street had depressed the value of their land.

Route description
The western terminus of Florida Avenue is at Massachusetts Avenue NW, 22nd Street NW, and Q Street NW.  From that terminus to 9th Street NW, Florida Avenue follows a winding path due to the city's topography.  From 9th Street NW, Florida Avenue follows a straight line to its eastern terminus at the "Starburst intersection" of H Street NE, 15th Street NE, Maryland Avenue NE, Benning Road NE, and Bladensburg Road NE.

Florida Avenue passes along the foot of the hilly terrain of Northwest Washington, D.C. This hilly area is the Wicomico-Sunderland Escarpment, which is part of the Atlantic Seaboard fall line. The escarpment helps mark the transition between the Appalachian Piedmont region north of the avenue and the flat Atlantic Coastal Plain terrain of the city's downtown area to the south.

Adjacent neighborhoods
Florida Avenue helps to define several neighborhoods in the District of Columbia. In the northwest quadrant, it forms one of the borders of the Columbia Heights neighborhood (which straddles 16th Street NW) along with Columbia Road NW. Florida Avenue also forms the boundary between Adams Morgan to the north and Dupont Circle to the south, helping to connect the major thoroughfares of Connecticut Avenue NW and 16th Street NW, and forms the northern boundary of the 18th Street NW shopping corridor. It also connects Adams Morgan and Dupont Circle with the Shaw neighborhood and the U Street retail and entertainment corridor. Heading east toward North Capitol Street, Florida Avenue borders LeDroit Park and Bloomingdale to the north, and Truxton Circle to the south.

In the northeast quadrant, Florida Avenue serves as the demarcation between the Eckington, Gallaudet University and Trinidad neighborhoods to the north, with NoMa and H Street/Atlas District to the south (also known as Near Northeast).

Landmarks
Gallaudet University, the American national university for the deaf, is located at 800 Florida Avenue NE. The campus consists of a unique collection of Victorian and Queen Anne style buildings on grounds with a landscape design by Frederick Law Olmsted. The Florida Avenue Grill, located at 1100 Florida Avenue NW, opened in 1944 and is a historic restaurant in the city.

Union Market and the adjacent retail strip anchor several blocks along the north side of northeast Florida Avenue, just west of Gallaudet University.

Former landmarks on Florida Avenue include Henderson's Castle, a massive red sandstone mansion built at the corner of Florida Avenue and 16th Street NW in 1888 for Senator John B. Henderson. The mansion was razed in 1949, although the retaining wall and gates have survived. Another former landmark was Holmead's Burying Ground, located on Florida Avenue between 19th and 20th Streets. Founded in 1796, it was the city's most prominent cemetery for the first 50 years of the 19th century. It was closed in 1874, and the bodies removed over the next decade. Griffith Stadium, also known as Boundary Stadium (for Boundary Street), was a major league baseball stadium bounded by Florida Avenue NW, W Street NW, Georgia Avenue NW, and 5th Street NW. Built in 1911, it was torn down in 1965.

Where Florida Avenue intersects New York Avenue is colloquially referred to as "Dave Thomas Circle".

Traffic Safety Concerns

Florida Avenue NE has been the subject of traffic safety discussions in recent years following high-profile pedestrian and cyclist deaths. Additionally, sidewalks and other infrastructure along this stretch do not meet modern ADA and safety requirements.

The District Department of Transportation began studying the area in 2013 with a final report produced in 2015, although few changes were implemented in the immediate following years. Under renewed pressure in spring 2019, interim changes were announced to alleviate the most urgent concerns. Planning for further permanent alterations remains underway.

References

Bibliography

External links
 

Streets in Washington, D.C.
Dupont Circle
Adams Morgan
U.S. Route 29
Trinidad (Washington, D.C.)